Dimitrios Agravanis (alternate spelling: Dimitris) (born December 20, 1994) is a Greek professional basketball player for Panathinaikos of the Greek Basket League and the EuroLeague.

Early life
Agravanis was born on December 20, 1994, in the Maroussi suburb of Athens, Greece. His basketball journey started at age nine, when his father set up a basket at their home. Playing basketball soon became Dimitris' favorite pastime. He enrolled at the local youth system academy of then Greek club Maroussi Athens as a kid, where he eventually made the club's first team, and signed a professional contract with them in 2010.

Professional career

Early years
Agravanis began his professional career in 2010, with the Greek Basket League club Maroussi Athens, and in 2012, he made a move to the Greek League club Panionios Athens, where he also competed in the European-wide 2nd-tier level EuroCup competition. Despite averaging fewer than 7 minutes per game with Panionios Athens, he showed promising signs of talent.

Olympiacos (2013–2019)
In 2013, Agravanis made the big move to the Greek League and European-wide 1st-tier level EuroLeague powerhouse Olympiacos Piraeus, who believed in him as a strong prospect, and signed him to a 5-year contract. At the beginning of his first season, Olympiacos Piraeus won the 2013 edition of the FIBA Intercontinental Cup title.

In the 2014–15 EuroLeague season, Olympiacos Piraeus finished runners-up in the EuroLeague, after losing to Real Madrid in the EuroLeague Final. Olympiacos also won the 2014–15 Greek League season's championship, after beating Panathinaikos Athens in the finals of the Greek League playoffs. During the season, Agravanis averaged 6.4 points per game, in 14.4 minutes per game in the Greek League, and 4.1 points per game, in 12.5 minutes per game in the EuroLeague.

With Olympiacos Piraeus, he also won the Greek League championship in 2016. In late July 2017, he re-signed with Olympiacos, through the summer of 2020, as he penned a three-year, €1.4 million euros net income guaranteed deal with the Reds. On July 24, 2019, Olympiacos Piraeus announced that they had waived his contract, and Agravanis thus became a free agent, after spending six seasons with the Reds.

Promitheas Patras (2019–2022)
Agravanis signed with the Greek EuroCup club Promitheas Patras in 2019. He averaged 8.2 points and 5.5 rebounds per game in the EuroCup's 2019–20 season. Agravanis re-signed with the team on July 15, 2020. During the 2021-22 campaign, in 29 league games, Agravanis averaged 14 points, 6.3 rebounds, 2.5 assists and 1.2 steals, playing around 25 minutes per contest.

Napoli (2022)
On September 27, 2022, Napoli Basket officially announced that they had signed Agravanis on a monthly contract with an option for the rest of the season. On October 31 of the same year, Napoli and Agravanis mutually parted ways. In 5 games, he averaged 8.2 points and 4.8 rebounds per contest.

Peristeri (2022–2023)
On November 4, 2022, Agravanis signed a two-year (1+1) contract with Peristeri, under coach Vassilis Spanoulis. On January 31, 2023, he mutually parted ways with the club.

Panathinaikos (2023–present)
On January 31, 2023, Agravanis, in a deeply controversial move, signed a two-and-a-half year contract with former rivals Panathinaikos, returning to the EuroLeague.

NBA draft rights
On June 25, 2015, Agravanis was selected with the 59th overall pick, of the 2015 NBA draft, by the NBA's Atlanta Hawks. His draft rights were then traded to the Cleveland Cavaliers in 2017, and were then traded to the Sacramento Kings a year later.

National team career

Greek junior national team
As a member of the Greek junior national teams, Agravanis played at the following tournaments: the 2010 FIBA Europe Under-16 Championship, the 2011 FIBA Europe Under-18 Championship, the 2012 FIBA Europe Under-18 Championship, the 2013 FIBA Europe Under-20 Championship, and the 2014 FIBA Europe Under-20 Championship.

Greek senior national team
Agravanis has also been a member of the senior men's Greek national team. He was selected to Greece's 12 man roster for the 2016 Turin FIBA World Olympic Qualifying Tournament. He also played with Greece at the 2017 EuroBasket.

In September, Agravanis participated in the EuroBasket 2022, representing Greece. Throughout the tournament, Agravanis averaged 6.3 points, 3.7 rebounds and 1.1 assist.Agravanis had his best performance in a game against Italy during the group phase, where he accumulated 13 points, 5 rebounds, 4 blocks in 24 minutes, as well as shooting an efficient 5/6 from the field, helping Greece secure the victory.

Personal life
Agravanis' younger brother, Ioannis, is also a professional basketball player.

Awards and accomplishments
FIBA Intercontinental Cup Champion: (2013)
2× Greek League Champion: (2015, 2016)
Greek Super Cup Winner: (2020)

Career statistics

Regular season 

|-
| 2010-11
| style="text-align:left;"| Marousi
| align=center | GBL
| 1 || 1.0 || .000 || .000 || 1.000 || .0 || .0 || .0 || .0 || 2.0
|-
| 2011–12
| style="text-align:left;"| Marousi
| align=center | GBL
| 14 || 11.5 || .333 || .400 || .560 || 2.8 || .3 || .5 || .4 || 3.8
|-
| 2012–13
| style="text-align:left;"| Panionios
| align=center | GBL
| 11 || 6.5 || .167 || .182 || .600 || 1.5 || .4 || .5 || .4 || 1.3
|-
| 2013–14
| style="text-align:left;"| Olympiacos
| align=center | GBL
| 13 || 7.7 || .343 || .182 || .800 || 1.2 || .5 || .3 || .1 || 2.6
|-
| 2014–15
| style="text-align:left;"| Olympiacos
| align=center | GBL
| 18 || 16.2 || .439 || .317 || .649 || 3.5 || .7 || .8 || .9 || 6.8
|-
| 2015–16
| style="text-align:left;"| Olympiacos
| align=center | GBL
| 22 || 13.3 || .455 || .364 || .561 || 3.2 || .5 || .7 || .7 || 6.0
|- 
| 2016–17
| style="text-align:left;"| Olympiacos
| align=center | GBL
| 19 || 13.4 || .483 || .292 || .400 || 4.6 || .5 || .3 || .3 || 5.8
|-
| 2017–18
| style="text-align:left;"| Olympiacos
| align=center | GBL
| 5 || 18.0 || .472 || .250 || .850 || 5.2 || 1.4 || .2 || .2 || 11.0
|-
| 2018–19
| style="text-align:left;"| Olympiacos
| align=center | GBL
| 10 || 4.9 || .462 || .429 || .833 || .8 || .1 || .0 || .0 || 3.2
|-
| 2019–20
| style="text-align:left;"| Promitheas
| align=center | GBL
| 17 || 21.2 || .414 || .346 || .426 || 5.0 || 1.3 || .6 || .4 || 10.8
|-
| 2020–21
| style="text-align:left;"| Promitheas
| align=center | GBL
| 21 || 25.4 || .420 || .326 || .728 || 5.9 || 1.4 || .8 || .5 || 12.8
|-
| 2021–22
| style="text-align:left;"| Promitheas
| align=center | GBL
| 19 || 23.9 || .537 || .278 || .592 || 6.9 || 2.3 || 1.2 || .4 || 13.8
|}

References

External links
 Dimitris Agravanis at archive.fiba.com
 Dimitris Agravanis at basket.gr
 Dimitris Agravanis at draftexpress.com
 Dimitris Agravanis at esake.gr 
 Dimitris Agravanis at eurobasket.com
 Dimitris Agravanis at euroleague.net
 Dimitris Agravanis at nbadraft.net
 Dimitris Agravanis at fibaeurope.com
 Dimitris Agravanis at sport-fm.gr 

1994 births
Living people
Atlanta Hawks draft picks
Centers (basketball)
Greek Basket League players
Greek men's basketball players
Greek expatriate basketball people in Italy
Maroussi B.C. players
Olympiacos B.C. players
Panathinaikos B.C. players
Panionios B.C. players
Peristeri B.C. players
Power forwards (basketball)
Promitheas Patras B.C. players
Basketball players from Athens
Napoli Basket players